Deni Bonet is a US-born singer-songwriter, electric violinist, and multi-instrumentalist.  She began her professional career in the house band of National Public Radio’s Mountain Stage radio show. She left to pursue a solo career and also became a prolific session musician.  She has toured and recorded with many notable performers including Cyndi Lauper, R.E.M., Sarah McLachlan, Richard Barone, and Robyn Hitchcock, and has released several CDs of her own original music.

Career
Deni has performed on several national television shows, including Saturday Night Live, Late Night with Conan O'Brien, The Today Show, and Last Call with Carson Daly. She was also a guest on an episode of the nationally syndicated Nate Berkus Show, discussing her unique holiday decorating style, and was featured in an episode of Fox Television's Ambush Makeover.

Deni was featured in the Jonathan Demme movie Storefront Hitchcock performing alongside Robyn Hitchcock. She was also the subject of a Wall Street Journal article on how artists were affected by the downturn in the economy, and a Billboard magazine article on her NYC-area cable TV show "Duets with Deni".

"Duets" featured live performances by local and international performers, accompanied by Deni.  Each 30-minute show featured two songs written by the guest, two written by Deni, and the show ended with a cover tune chosen by both Deni and her guest.  Season One featured Sean Altman, Jenny Bruce, Dave Foster, Roger Greenawalt, Lach, Richard Barone, Robyn Hitchcock, Kimberley Rew, and Bari Koral.  Season Two featured Jon Spurney, Bill Clift, Christine Ohlman, Mary Lee Kortes, John Wesley Harding, and Patti Rothberg.

Deni's music has been featured in several television shows, including Cathouse and Passions, and she has scored the soundtracks of the American Civil War Drama Red Legged Devils] and the recently released Western Drama West of Thunder, in which she also appears. Bonet is also featured in Richard Barone's "'cool blue halo' 25th Anniversary Concert" DVD released in winter 2012.

She is an endorsee of Barcus-Berry Electric Violins, Martin Guitars, Kala Brand Ukuleles, Daisy Rock Girl Guitars, and Thomastik-Infeld Strings in the USA and worldwide.  Deni Bonet also operates OverdubStrings.com, an online business that creates and arranges violin, fiddle, and accordion tracks for studio and home recording projects.

Deni was honored to be invited to accompany Irish multi-platinum performer Mundy (born Edmund Enright) at the official White House St Patrick's Day reception in Washington DC, where they performed several songs for President Barack Obama, First Lady Michelle Obama, Vice President Joe Biden, the Taoiseach (Prime Minister) of Ireland, and several hundred invited guests.

In February 2017 Deni released the all-instrumental album Bright Shiny Objects on Zip Records, distributed on Sony RED in the US and Rough Trade in the Benelux countries.  Featuring songs co-written with Stephen Gaboury, Richard Barone and Jon Cobert among others, the album was recorded with world-class session musicians including Shawn Pelton, Will Lee, Steve Holley, Graham Maby, and Liberty DeVitto.  Produced by Emmy award-winning engineer Paul Bevan, recorded and mixed by Robert L. Smith, and mastered by Scott Hull at Masterdisk, the album showcases Deni's broad musical talent across a wide variety of musical genres. Shortly thereafter she performed 3 of her original songs live at Carnegie Hall.

Subsequent to the release of the new album, Deni embarked on two-month-long European tours, performing in the UK (including the legendary Cavern Club in Liverpool), Ireland, Belgium, the Netherlands and Finland.

The Huffington Post published an article about Deni in September 2017 which included the premiere of the video for "Light This Candle".

In October 2017 Deni premiered orchestral versions of several of her recordings, performing with the award-winning Baylor University Symphony, including two orchestrated by Gene Pritsker, one by Stephen Gaboury, and Edgar Winter's "Frankenstein (instrumental)" orchestrated by Danny Elfman's orchestrator Steve Bartek (who has orchestrated the music for all of Tim Burton's movies). The performance, conducted by maestro Stephen Heyde and with concertmaster Joseph Duque, was met with a standing ovation.

In February 2018 Deni was invited back to Carnegie Hall, performing an electric set culminating with Edgar Winter's "Frankenstein (instrumental)".  She was invited back again in February 2019 and she received a standing ovation after her set, and again in February 2020.

In 2019 Deni was appointed an Arts Envoy by the US State Department, and spent August in Zanzibar at the Dhow Countries Music Academy teaching songwriting, violin, and rock n' roll.

In January 2020 Deni returned to Zanzibar to record original music with local Tanzanian band Stone Town Rockerz which will appear on her new album, to be released later this year.  In February she appeared once again at Carnegie Hall as a headliner as part of the Sixth Chinese New Year Spectacular, and also performed as soloist on four of her own songs with the Danbury (CT) Community Orchestra.

During the COVID-19 pandemic Deni has been keeping busy while staying home, broadcasting a popular fortnightly "Happy Hour Live" show on Facebook Live and YouTube Live to a global audience, and working on the final tracks for her new album which will be released in 2022.

Discography

 The Split Squad - Another Cinderella (2021) played Strings and String Arrangements
 John Brennan - No Offense, None Taken (2021) played Violin and Ukulele
 Matt Owens (of Noah and the Whale) - Hungover in New York (2020) played Violin
 Luan Parle – Never Say Goodbye (2020) played Violin
 Marci Geller – Bare (2019) strings and string arrangements, also Accordion
 Larry Kirwan - Heroes/Belfast EP (2018) played Violin, Strings and Vocals
 Salim Nourallah - Somewhere South Of Sane (2018) played Violin, Viola and String Arrangements
 Deni Bonet – Bright Shiny Objects (2017) Main performer
 Niall Connolly – Dream Your Way Out Of This One (2017) played Violin, Viola and String Arrangements
 R.E.M. – Out Of Time (2016) played Violin
 Tiny Tim – Tiny Tim's America (2016) played Accordion and Violin
 Larry Groce, Michael Cerveris and Everybody – Take Me Home Country Roads (2016) played Violin
 Honor Finnegan – Roses And Victory (2016) played Violin
 The Junior League – Also Rans (2015) played Violin, Viola and String Arrangements
 Amy Soucy – This River (2015) played Violin
 Kevin Brown – Grit (2015) played Violin
 Rebecca Lowe – Rebecca Lowe (2015) – string arrangements, played Violins
 Eupana – So Many Suns (2014) string arrangements, played Violin and Viola
 Judy Kass – Better Things (2014) played Violin and Viola
 Deni Bonet – It's All Good (2013) Main performer
 Jade Summers – Vintage (2013) played Violin, Viola and String Arrangements
 The Junior League – You Should Be Happy (2013) played Violin, and String Arrangements
 Friction Farm – I Read Your Book (2013) played Violin
 The Fishkillers – West Of Thunder (2013) played Violin, Viola, Accordion, Ukulele and Vocals
 Pete Seeger – God's Counting On Me, God's Counting On You (2012) played Violin, and Chorus
 Richard Barone – Cool Blue Halo 25th Anniversary Concert (2012) played Violin
 Arlon Bennett – World Of Possibility (2012) played Violin 
 Gathering Time – Red Apples And Gold (2012) played Violin
 Kati Mac – Save Me From Myself (2012) played Violin
 Pinataland – Hymns for the Dreadful Night (2011) played Violin and Viola
 Richard X. Heyman – Tiers: And Other Stories (2011) played Viola and Violin
 Luminosity – Luminosity (2011) played Accordion and Violin
 Richard Barone – Glow (2010) played Violin
 The Cynthia Kaplan Ordeal – Fangry (2010) played Violin
 Ken Bari Murray – Four Seasons (2010) played Violin
 Clara Lofaro – Clara Lofaro (2010) played Violin, and String Arrangements
 John Wesley Harding – Who Was Changed And Who Was Dead (2009) played Violin, Viola, String Arrangements and Vocals
 Rosemary Loar – Indigo and Iridescent (2009) played Viola and Violin
 Tiny Tim – I've Never Seen a Straight Banana: Rare Moments, Vol. 1 (2009) played Accordion, Ukulele, Viola, Violin and Vocals
 Bud Buckley – Sitting On The Wind (2009) played Violin and Viola
 Meg Braun – Tomboy Princess (2009) played Violin
 Deni Bonet – Last Girl On Earth (2008) Main performer
 Deni Bonet – It's You And Me This Christmas (2008) Main performer
 Gene Clark and Carla Olson – In Concert (2007) played Violin and Vocals
 Jewmongous (feat. Sean Altman)- Taller Than Jesus (2007) played Violin
 Jenn Friedman – Open Book (2007) played Violin
 Bud Buckley – It's About Time (2007) played Violin and Viola
 Jen Eliott & Bluestruck – This Damn Song (2006) played Viola and Violin
 Dave Rave – Anthology, Vol. 1: The Hot Tunes (2006) played Violin and Vocals
 Clara Lofaro – Black + Blue Pearl (2006) played Viola and Violin
 Dave Revels – Family Ties (2006) played Violin and Accordion
 Jen Elliott – This Damn Song (2006) played Violin and Cello
 Sarah McLachlan – Surfacing/Solace (2005) played Viola, Violin and String Arrangements
 The L Word – L Word: The Second Season Sessions (2005) played Viola and Violin
 Brian Lane Green – Waiting for the Glaciers to Melt (2005) played Violin
 Various Artists – String Quartet Tribute to Weezer: Pull This String (2005) played Viola and Violin
 Judy Gorman – Analog Girl In A Digital World (2005) played Viola and Violin
 Deni Bonet - Acoustic, OK? (2004) played Violin, Viola, Accordion and Vocals
 The Hyperjinx Tricycle – Songs of Jack Medicine, Daniel Johnston & Ron English (2004) played Violin
 Various Artists – String Quartet Tribute to Weezer: Come On and Kick Me (2004) played Viola and Violin
 Bibi Farber – Second Kiss (2004) played Violin
 Lora Lee and Leo – Blue Horse (2003) played Violin, Viola and Accordion
 Lee Cave-Berry – Spring Forward (2003) played Violin
 Drive Til Morning – Drive Til Morning (2002) played Viola and Violin
 Sean Altman – alt.mania (2002) played Violin
 Lora Lee and Robbie – You Can't Half Tell (2002) played Violin and Viola
 Chris Butler – Museum Of Me, Vol. 1 (2002) played Violin
 Deni Bonet – Bigger Is Always Better (2001) Main performer
 Various Artists – Zipped Up And Down (Under) (2001) played Violin and Vocals
 Violet – We Both Know It's Out There (2001) played Accordion, Viola and Violin
 Tom Paxton – Live From Mountain Stage (2001) played Violin and Vocals
 Esther – Eve's Lament (2001) played Viola and Violin
 The Parlor Dogs – Social Harem (2000) played Accordion and Vocals
 Taylor Barton – 13 Break Ups (2000) played Accordion, Viola, Violin and Vocals
 Marc Farre – Man on the Sun (2000) played Violin
 Robyn Hitchcock – Storefront Hitchcock (2000) played Violin 
 Various Artists – Songs Of Bruce Springsteen (2000) played Violin (performing with Ben E King) 
 Lach – Blang! (1999) played Viola and Violin
 Lauren Agnelli & Dave Rave – Heaven & Earth (1999) played Violin
 The Novellas – Magnets in Intimate Places (1999) played Viola and Violin
 Kramer – Let Me Explain Something To You About Art (1998) played Accordion, Viola and Violin
 Various Artists – What's That I Hear?: The Songs of Phil Ochs (1998) played Viola, Violin and Vocals (performed with Lauren Agnelli, Dave Rave, and Pat Humphries)
 Glen or Glenda – Reasons in the Sun (1998) played Viola and Violin
 Judy Gorman – Analog Girl in a Digital World (1998) played Violin and Viola
 Fuzzbuddy – Fuzzbuddy (1998) played Violin
 Various Artists – Texans Live From Mountain Stage (1997) played Violin and Vocals (performed with Sara Hickman)
 Gravity Kills – Manipulated (1997) played Violin
 Various Artists – One Step Up/Two Steps Back: The Songs of Bruce Springsteen (1997) played Violin
 Lauren Agnelli & Dave Rave – Confetti (1997) played Violin
 Various Artists – Celtic Music Live From Mountain Stage (1997) played Violin (performed with Luka Bloom)
 Various Artists – Louisiana Live From Mountain Stage (1996) played Fiddle (performed with Allen Toussaint)
 Robyn Hitchcock – Moss Elixir / Mossy Liquor (1996) played Percussion, Piano and Violin
 Sarah McLachlan – Rarities, B-Sides & Other Stuff [1996] (1996) played Viola and Violin
 Various Artists – Women: Live From Mountain Stage (1996) played Violin and Vocals (performing with Victoria Williams)
 Deni Bonet – Deni Bonet (1996) Main performer
 Various Artists – Live From Mountain Stage, Vol. 8 (1995) played Violin (performing with John Gorka) 
 Iain Matthews – Camouflage (1995) played Violin
 Various Artists – Christmas at Mountain Stage (1994) played Violin and Vocals (performed with Michael Martin Murphey and Mike Seeger)
 Various Artists – Upfront! Canadians Live from Mountain Stage (1994) played Violin (performed with Sarah McLachlan) 
 Lim Giong – Entertainment World (1994) played Violin (incorrectly credited as Denny Bonnett)
 Various Artists – Best Of Mountain Stage Live, Vol. 5 (1993) played Violin (performing with Kevin Welch)
 Maryen Cairns – For Eternity (1993) played Violin
 Various Artists – Best Of Mountain Stage, Live Vol. 4 (1992) played Violin (performing with Allen Toussaint and Tracy Nelson
 Various Artists – Best of Mountain Stage, Live Vol. 3 (1992) played Violin (performing with Warren Zevon and Sarah McLachlan)
 Rod MacDonald – Highway To Nowhere (1992) played Violin
 Sarah McLachlan – Path Of Thorns (1991) played Viola, Violin and String Arrangements
 Sarah McLachlan – Solace (1991) played Viola, Violin Arrangements and String Arrangements
 Chris Whitley – Living with the Law (1991) played Viola
 Various Artists – Best of Mountain Stage, Live Vol. 2 (1991) played Violin (performing with R.E.M., Robyn Hitchcock, and Michelle Shocked)
 Various Artists – Best of Mountain Stage, Live Vol. 1 (1991) played Violin
 Stark Raven – Learning To Fly (1989) played Violin and Vocals
 Stark Raven – One Hundred Million Reasons (1985) played Violin and Vocals

Film credits
 Richard Barone Cool Blue Halo 25th Anniversary Concert (2012) – performs as herself
 West of Thunder (2012) – appears as the fiddler
 Cyndi Lauper – Live… At Last (2004) played Violin
 Robyn Hitchcock – Storefront Hitchcock (1998) played Violin
 Chillers'' (1987) – performing as one half of The Fabulous Twister Sisters

References

External links
 
 denibonetjapan.blogspot.com/ – Deni Bonet Japanese Fan Site
 YouTube.com – Deni Bonet video channel on YouTube
 OverdubStrings.com – Deni Bonet custom string arrangements site

Year of birth missing (living people)
Living people
American women singer-songwriters
Electric violinists
21st-century violinists
21st-century American women